Rajesh Khanna (born Jatin Khanna; 29 December 1942  18 July 2012) was an Indian actor, film producer and politician. He won seven All-India Critics Association (AICA) Best Actor awards, and received 10 nominations.  He won four Best Actor awards in the Bengal Film Journalists' Association Awards, and received 25 nominations. He won three Filmfare Awards for Best Actor, one Filmfare Special Award in 1973, and received a Filmfare Special Award in 1991, after 25 years in the Hindi film industry. He received the Filmfare Lifetime Achievement Award at the 50th Filmfare Awards in 2005.

He was posthumously awarded the Padma Bhushan, India's third highest civilian award, in 2013.

Civilian Awards
 2013 – Padma Bhushan (Posthumously)

Filmfare Awards
Winner
 1971 – Best Actor for Sachaa Jhutha
 1972 – Best Actor for Anand
 1973 – Special Award for Anuraag
 1975 – Best Actor for Avishkaar
 1991 – Special Award for completing 25 years in the Indian Film Industry.
 2005 – Lifetime Achievement Award (Golden Jubilee function)

Nominated
 1970 – Best Actor for Aradhana
 1970 – Best Actor for Ittefaq
 1972 – Best Actor for Kati Patang
 1973 – Best Actor for Dushman
 1973 – Best Actor for Amar Prem
 1974 – Best Actor for Daag: A Poem of Love
 1975 – Best Actor for Prem Nagar
 1980 – Best Actor for Amar Deep
 1981 – Best Actor for Thodisi Bewafaii
 1982 – Best Actor for Dard
 1984 – Best Actor for Avtaar

Bengal Film Journalists' Association Awards
Rajesh Khanna won 4 Bengal Film Journalists' Association Awards for Best Actor.

Winner
 1972 – Best Actor for Anand
 1973 – Best Actor for Bawarchi
 1974 – Best Actor for Namak Haraam
 1987 – Best Actor for Amrit

Stardust Awards
Winner
2005 – Pride of Film Industry Award'

International Indian Film Academy Awards
Winner
2009 – Lifetime Achievement Award

Tamil Cine World Awards
Winner
2009 – All India Film Workers Association Life Time Achievement Award

Pune International Film Festival (PIFF)
Winner
2010 – Lifetime Achievement Award

Bollywood Movie Awards
Winner
2004 – Lifetime of Glamour award at the Kingfisher Bollywood Fashion Awards
2004 – Lifetime Achievement Award at the Bollywood Awards held in US

Zee Cine Awards
Winner
2001 – Zee Cine Lifetime Achievement Award for Contribution to Indian Cinema

Sansui Film Awards
Winner
2001 – Lifetime Achievement Awards at the 3rd Sansui Film Awards held at the Indira Gandhi Indoor Stadium

All India Critics Association Awards
Winner
 1985 – All-India Critics Association (AICA) Award for Best Actor for Aaj Ka M.L.A. Ram Avtar

Apsara Film & Television Producers Guild Awards
Winner
 2012 – Lifetime Achievement Award for  Major Contribution to Indian Cinema by the Film and Television Producers Guild Association

Other Awards
Winner
 1982 – Winner Lions Club, New Delhi – Best Actor for Dard
 1994 – Winner Russian Film Festival, Ujvegistan – Best Actor for Khudai
 2003 – Maharashtra State Government's Raj Kapoor Awards presented on 30 April 2003
 2006 – Yugantar Gaurav Puraskar 2006 awarded by Chandibai Himmatmal Mansukhani (CHM) College as part of the Gaurav Diwas celebrations on 4 February 2006
 2006 – Award for Outstanding Contribution to Indian Cinema at the 2006 Bollywood Movie Awards held on 10 June, at the Centre of Excellence, Macoya, Trinidad and Tobago
 Glory of India Award by IIFS, London
 Mother Teresa Award
 Bharat Jyoti National Award

Kala Ratna Award
 1995 – Kala Ratna Award by Punjabi Kala Sangam at Delhi by the then Human Resource Development Minister Arjun Singh

References

External links 
 

Lists of awards received by Indian actor
Awards